The 2020 Erste Bank Open was a men's tennis tournament played on indoor hard courts. It was the 46th edition of the event, and part of the ATP Tour 500 Series of the 2020 ATP Tour. It was held at the Wiener Stadthalle in Vienna, Austria, from 26 October until 30 
October 2022. One seed
 Daniil medvedev won the singles title.

Singles main-draw entrants

Seeds

 Rankings are as of 19 October 2020

Other entrants
The following players received wildcards into the singles main draw: 
  Novak Djokovic
  Dennis Novak
  Jurij Rodionov
  Jannik Sinner

The following player received entry using a special exempt:
  Dan Evans

The following players received entry using a protected ranking into the singles main draw:
  Kevin Anderson
  Kei Nishikori

The following players received entry from the qualifying draw:
  Attila Balázs
  Aljaž Bedene
  Norbert Gombos
  Vasek Pospisil

The following players received entry as lucky losers:
  Jason Jung
  Vitaliy Sachko
  Lorenzo Sonego

Withdrawals
  Matteo Berrettini → replaced by  Taylor Fritz
  Fabio Fognini → replaced by  Filip Krajinović
  David Goffin → replaced by  Jan-Lennard Struff
  John Isner → replaced by  Jason Jung
  Kei Nishikori → replaced by  Vitaliy Sachko
  Milos Raonic → replaced by  Hubert Hurkacz
  Diego Schwartzman → replaced by  Lorenzo Sonego

Doubles main-draw entrants

Seeds

 Rankings are as of 19 October 2020

Other entrants
The following pairs received wildcards into the doubles main draw:
  Dominic Thiem /  Dennis Novak
  Daniel Evans /  Oliver Marach

The following pair received entry from the qualifying draw:
  Karol Drzewiecki /  Szymon Walków

Finals

Singles

  Andrey Rublev def.  Lorenzo Sonego, 6–4, 6–4

Doubles

  Łukasz Kubot /  Marcelo Melo def.  Jamie Murray /  Neal Skupski, 7–6(7–5), 7–5

References

External links
 

Erste Bank Open
Vienna Open
Erste Bank Open
Erste Bank Open
Erste Bank Open